is a Shinto shrine in the Shinichicho neighborhood of the city of Fukuyama in Hiroshima Prefecture, Japan. It is the ichinomiya of former Bingo Province. The main festival of the shrine is held annually on November 23.

Enshrined kami
The kami enshrined at Kibitsu Jinja are:
 , son of Emperor Kōrei, conqueror of the Kingdom of Kibi
 ,  Emperor Kōrei
 , empress of Emperor Kōrei.
 , younger brother of Kibitsuhiko

History
The origins of Kibitsu Jinja are uncertain. The shrine claims that when Kibi Province was divided into three provinces in 806, it was established as a bunrei from the original Kibitsu Shrine in Okayama. However, there is no documentary evidence to support this, and the shrine does not appear in the Engishiki, which was complied between 905 and 967 AD. The first time the shrine is mentioned in a historical source is in 1148 in which the name is mentioned in the records of Yasaka Shrine, and archaeological excavations on the grounds have found not artifacts earlier than the 12th century. However, from the Kamakura period, it was regarded as the ichinomiya of the province, and had a large number of estates, with which it often clashed with secular authorities.

During the Nanboku-cho period, the shrine is the location where Imperial loyalist Sakurayama Koretoshi (桜山茲俊) raised an army in 1331 in support of the Southern Court. However, as detailed in the Taiheiki, after receiving a false report that Kusunoki Masashige had been defeated at Akasaka Castle, he committed suicide with his wife and children and burned the shrine down. This event led to the area around the shrine to be designated as a National Historic Site in 1934.

Kō no Moroyasu issued a decree in 1346 ordering the Bingo shugo to stop harassing the shrine. During the Sengoku period, the shrine was supported by Mōri Terumoto, and in the Edo Period it was supported by the Fukushima clan and the Mizuno clan who were  daimyō  of Fukuyama Domain.

The shrine is located a twenty-minute walk from Shin-ichi Station on the JR West Fukuen Line.

Cultural properties

National Important Cultural Properties
Honden, constructed in 1648 as a donation by Mizuno Katsushige. It is a seven by four bay hall in the relatively large and has a flat "Yomazukuri" style which is common in the Bingo and Aki regions 
Komainu, Heian period, group of three with height of 78, 80 and 82 centimeters. As Komainu come in sets of two, one is missing. The statues are now kept at the Tokyo National Museum.
Tachi, Sengoku period. Set of four. In 1972, the sword fittings were stolen and their whereabouts are unknown. The blades are currently deposited at the Okayama Prefectural Museum.

Gallery

See also
Ichinomiya
List of Historic Sites of Japan (Hiroshima)

References

External links

Official home page

Shinto shrines in Hiroshima Prefecture
Bingo Province
Fukuyama, Hiroshima
Ichinomiya
Historic Sites of Japan
Beppyo shrines